Tramagal is a Portuguese freguesia ("civil parish"), located in Abrantes Municipality, in Santarém District. The population in 2011 was 3,500, in an area of 24.10 km². The parish is the third-most populous in the municipality.

References

Freguesias of Abrantes